Baogang Dadao Station, known as Changgang Zhonglu Station during planning, is a metro station on Line 8 of the Guangzhou Metro. The underground station is located on Changgang Middle Road in the Haizhu District. The station opened on November3, 2010 after a delay caused by the cooling tower at Shayuan Station.

Station layout

Exits

References

Railway stations in China opened in 2010
Guangzhou Metro stations in Haizhu District